Fansipaniana is a genus of moths belonging to the subfamily Olethreutinae of the family Tortricidae. It contains two species found in Vietnam, Fansipaniana fansipana in 2009 and the second in 2016.

The wingspan is about 14 mm for males and 19 mm for females. The ground colour of the forewings of the males is greyish cream densely dotted with rust, but paler near the tornus. In females, the ground colour is suffused rust except for the postmedian area, where it forms a cream coloured rounded blotch followed by blackish suffusion marked with minute refractive dots arranged in two rows. The hindwings are grey in both sexes, but darker in females.

Etymology
The name of both the genus and species refers to type locality.

See also
List of Tortricidae genera

References

External links
tortricidae.com

Olethreutini